The Hermann Göring Collection, also known as the Kunstsammlung Hermann Göring, was an extensive private art collection of Nazi Reichsmarschall Hermann Göring, formed for the most part by looting of Jewish property in Nazi-occupied areas between 1936 and 1945.

Historical Context 
Hermann Göring was one of the most powerful Nazis. Convicted of war crimes, he was sentenced to death at Nuremberg. In 1936, he conceived the plan to convert his hunting lodge in the Schorfheide region north of Berlin into a country house, called the Waldhof Carinhall. There he had a 34-meter-long hall built, called the Grand Gallery, where he exhibited the most important pieces of his collection. Initially, Goering financed his passion for collecting visual art with gifts from industrialists in exchange for a favor of friends.

During World War II Göring enriched himself on a large scale with art obtained from Jewish art collectors who were plundered and either fled or were deported to their deaths in Nazi camps. At the end of the war, Göring's personal collection included 1,375 paintings, many sculptures, carpets, furniture and other artifacts. It is estimated that at least half of these artworks were obtained through Nazi looting efforts.

How Göring acquired art looted from Jews 
Göring visited the Parisian museum Jeu de Paume that was used to warehouse artworks seized from French Jews about twenty times between 1941 and 1944, to select artworks of especially high quality that had been picked out especially for him. In addition to about 700 works of art that Göring grabbed from the Nazi looting organisation, the Einsatzstab Reichsleiter Rosenberg, Göring also deployed his own organization, the Devisenschutzkommando, in the occupied territories to confiscate art on his behalf. From 1937 onwards, Göring received assistance from the art dealer Walter Andreas Hofer in compiling his art collection. From 1939 to 1944 Hofer acted as director of the Rijksmarschalks Kunstcollectie. After the war, Hofer was sentenced in absentia to 10 years in prison by a military court. This sentence was never executed and Hofer was able to continue his art trade in Munich undisturbed.

As early as July 1940, Göring turned up in Amsterdam and showed an interest in the art trade of Jacques Goudstikker, who died fleeing the Nazis. On July 13, 1940, Ten Broek, the illegally appointed agent of the Jacques Goudstikker art dealership, sold to Göring for NLG 2,000,000 (value 2005: €13,750,000): the rights to all paintings, drawings, antiques and other art objects, which Found in the Netherlands on June 26, 1940 and then owned by the public limited company. Goering bought all 1,113 of the inventoried paintings and artifacts at no more than one-sixth of their actual value (a transaction that resembles an imitation). The sale to Göring also included 'three ceiling pieces' by Gerard de Lairesse, present in the ceiling of one of the rooms of the 458 Herengracht building where Goudstikkers art dealership was located. After the panels had been detached from the ceilings, they were transported to Berlin, as were the more than 780 paintings that were immediately taken by Goering himself.

Monuments Men and the Göring Collection 
The Allied officers in the Monuments, Fine Arts, and Archives section, commonly known as the Monuments Men, recovered many artworks from the Göring collection and investigated their looting.  The series of reports written in 1945-6 by the OSS Art Looting Investigation Unit to document Nazi art looting networks included much information about the creation of the Göring Collection. A special detailed report, entitled "Consolidated Interrogation Report Number 2: the Göring Collection", focused on the art dealing networks supporting Göring's acquisition of looted art. The reports were marked classified and inaccessible for many years until they were declassified and published many years after the war.

Inventory of Hermann Göring's art collection 
In the past twenty years, there have been numerous attempts to inventory Göring's collection of looted art. Berlin's German Historical Museum published the full inventory of Göring's collection in 2012, but the site no longer appears to function. Jean-Marc Dreyfus published the catalog in book form in 2015.

Sarah Wildman, writing in the New Yorker, described Göring's inventory as "a twisted treasure map, a guide to looting and pillaging and gift-giving among the Nazi brass, and a tracking mechanism for the Nazi occupation of Europe." At the end of the war, she writes, Göring packed the booty stored at Carinhall into trains and fled south toward Berchtesgaden, in Bavaria; he blew up Carinhall behind him. The collection was discovered by Allied soldiers."

Legacy of the Göring Collection 

While some artworks have been returned to families of the Nazi's victims, many of the artwork seized have never been returned to their pre-Nazi owners. In 2015 it was discovered that some of the paintings in the Göring collection that had been recovered by Monuments Men were given to the families of Nazis instead of being returned to the families of the looted Jewish collectors.

See also 

 Carinhall
 Hermann Göring
 Nazi Plunder
 List of claims for restitution for Nazi-looted art

Further reading 

 Günther Haase, Die Kunstsammlung des Reichsmarschalls Hermann Göring, eine Dokumentation, ISBN 978-3-86124-520-9
 Nancy Yeide, Beyond the Dreams of Avarice: The Hermann Goering Collection.

References

Nazi Germany
Nazi-looted art
German art collectors
Hermann Göring